Isostigma is a genus of South American flowering plants in the daisy family.

 Species

References

Coreopsideae
Asteraceae genera
Flora of South America